Christina Ayala (born January 4, 1983) is an American politician who served in the Connecticut House of Representatives from the 128th district from 2013 to 2015.

On September 26, 2014, she was arrested on multiple charges of voter fraud. On September 25, 2015, she was sentenced to a one-year suspended prison term.

References

1983 births
Living people
Democratic Party members of the Connecticut House of Representatives
Connecticut politicians convicted of crimes